Náměšť na Hané is a market town in Olomouc District in the Olomouc Region of the Czech Republic. It has about 2,200 inhabitants.

History
The first written mention of Náměšť na Hané is from 1141.

Twin towns – sister cities

Náměšť na Hané is twinned with:
 Levice, Slovakia
 Szczytna, Poland

References

External links

Náměšť na Hané Château

Market towns in the Czech Republic
Populated places in Olomouc District